The Guatemala Open or Abierto de Guatemala is a golf tournament that was on the schedules of the Tour de las Américas and Challenge Tour between 2003 and 2007. It was held at the Hacienda Nueva Country Club in Guatemala City.

Winners

Notes

External links
 Official coverage on the Challenge Tour's official site

Golf tournaments in Guatemala
Former Challenge Tour events
Former Tour de las Américas events